Pseudolithoxus tigris is a species of armored catfish endemic to Venezuela where it is found in the upper Orinoco and Ventuari River basins.  This species grows to a length of  SL.

P. tigris probably matures at a relatively small size; in a specimen about 5 cm (2 in) SL, the snout and pectoral-fin spine odontodes are already greatly elongated, while the odontodes are only beginning to develop in similarly sized specimens of other species.

References
 

Ancistrini
Fish of Venezuela
Endemic fauna of Venezuela
Fish described in 2000
Taxa named by Jonathan W. Armbruster